Maximilian Pilzer (February 26, 1890 – May 30, 1958) was a conductor and violinist. He was concertmaster of the New York Philharmonic orchestra from 1915 to 1917.  On May 30, 1958, Pilzer was conducting the annual Naumburg Memorial Concert, at New York City's Central Park, before thousands of spectators and a live radio audience.  According to The New York Times "Mr. Pilzer was conducting Johann Strauss's gay overture to Die Fledermaus when he fell backward. His head struck the edge of the stage, where there is a strip of concrete." Attempts to revive him were unsuccessful, and Pilzer was pronounced dead on arrival at a nearby hospital.

References

Deaths from falls
American male conductors (music)
1890 births
1958 deaths
Concertmasters of the New York Philharmonic
20th-century American conductors (music)
20th-century American violinists
20th-century American male musicians
Male classical violinists